Cordaro Jerome "Cord" Howard (born July 2, 1987) is an American retired football guard. After playing college football for Georgia Tech, he was signed by the Buffalo Bills as an undrafted free agent in 2010.

Career

Buffalo Bills
Howard was signed by the Buffalo Bills as an undrafted free agent following the 2010 NFL Draft on April 24, 2010. He was placed on injured reserve on December 28. He was released during final roster cuts on September 3, 2011.

Baltimore Ravens
Howard was signed by the Baltimore Ravens on July 25, 2012.

References

External links
Winnipeg Blue Bombers bio 
Baltimore Ravens bio
Buffalo Bills bio
Georgia Tech Yellow Jackets football bio

1987 births
Living people
American football offensive guards
Georgia Tech Yellow Jackets football players
Buffalo Bills players
Baltimore Ravens players